The Canal de Berry is a disused canal in France which links the Canal latéral à la Loire at Marseilles-lès-Aubigny with the Cher at Noyers rejoining the Loire near Tours. There is now a  operational segment with five locks between Selles-sur-Cher and Noyers-sur-Cher.

Construction
Although discussed from 1484, it was not until 1780 when Armand II-Joseph, 6th Duke of Béthune Charost presented  the first solid proposal to the provincial assembly. But work did not start until after an imperial decree in 1809 and was not completed until 1839. The work was designed by Joseph-Michel Dutens and mainly carried out by Spanish prisoners of war in the 1820s.

Barges built to this gauge are called berrichons. They could carry about 60 tonnes of freight over the summit of the Canal de Berry but their draught allowed them to carry up to 100 tonnes on other French waterways. By 1865 there were 890 berrichons on the waterway, drawn by teams of two to four horses, mules or donkeys.

The main traffic of the canal was cast iron from the forges at Montluçon, and coal, pit props, wines and spirits. However despite a new pumping station in 1878, leakages caused a lowering of water levels so the canal was never upgraded to the Freycinet gauge. Traffic declined steadily till the 1930s and was finally closed in 1955.

Restoration
There is an active Association for Reopening the Canal de Berry (ARECABE) which has so far succeeded in rewatering  of the canal and two locks. It organises festivals and there is a canal museum at Reugny.

See also
 List of canals in France

References

Berry
Canals opened in 1839
1839 establishments in France